The Democratic Ashkali Party of Kosovo (PDAK) is an Ashkali political party in Kosovo.

At the legislative elections held on 24 October 2004, the party won 1 out of 120 seats. They lost their seat in the 2019 election.

References

Ashkali
Political parties of minorities in Kosovo